The AN/APG-78 Longbow is a millimeter-wave fire-control radar (FCR) system for the AH-64D/E Apache attack helicopter. It was initially developed in the 1980s as the Airborne Adverse Weather Weapon System (AAWWS) as part of the Multi-Stage Improvement Program (MSIP) to enhance the AH-64A. By 1990, both AAWWS and MSIP were renamed Longbow. The radar is produced by Longbow LLC, a joint venture of Lockheed Martin and Northrop Grumman.

Description
The AN/APG-78 Longbow is a millimeter-wave fire-control radar (FCR) target acquisition system and the Radar Frequency Interferometer (RFI), which are housed in a dome located above the main rotor. The radome's raised position enables target detection while the helicopter is behind obstacles (e.g. terrain, trees or buildings). The APG-78 is capable of simultaneously tracking up to 128 targets and engaging up to 16 at once; an attack can be initiated within 30 seconds. A radio modem integrated with the sensor suite allows data to be shared with ground units and other Apaches, allowing them to fire on targets detected by a single helicopter.

The updated AN/APG-78 radar for the AH-64E Guardian has overwater capabilities, potentially enabling naval strikes.

Applications
 AgustaWestland Apache Longbow
 Bell AH-1Z Viper (option)
 Boeing AH-64D Apache Longbow
 Boeing AH-64E Apache Guardian
 Boeing–Sikorsky RAH-66 Comanche (canceled)

See also
 List of radars
 Searchwater
 Seaspray (radar)

References

External links

 Northrop Grumman AN/APG-78 Longbow Fire Control Radar (FCR) page
 Lockheed Martin Longbow FCR page

Helicopter radars
Military radars of the United States
Military electronics of the United States
Northrop Grumman radars
Military equipment introduced in the 1990s